Mariana Rios Botelho (born 4 July 1985) is a Brazilian actress and singer-songwriter.

Biography
Rios began singing at age seven. To begin her career, she moved to Uberaba, where she played several gigs with local bar bands. She participated in music festivals and was hired by a studio to sing jingles. At 15 she moved to Rio de Janeiro and graduated in Casa de Arte das Laranjeiras. Before joining the cast of the telenovela Malhação, she participated in two musicals with Oswaldo Montenegro.
	
In 2008, she joined the cast of the telenovela Malhação as Yasmin, a 17-year-old girl whose parents are often absent and try to compensate this by buying her expensive gifts. Due to the success of Yasmin, Rios made the cover of the August 2008 magazine Capricho (1051 edition). Mariana lives alone in Rio de Janeiro since she turned 18 years old. She has a relationship with the vocalist of the band NX Zero, Di Ferrero. She played the character Nancy in the 2010 Rede Globo telenovela Araguaia.

In 2015, Rios will play Elphaba in the Brazilian production of Wicked.

Career

Discography

Studio Album

Singles

Awards & nominations

References

External links 

 

1985 births
Living people
People from Minas Gerais
Brazilian telenovela actresses
Brazilian television actresses
21st-century Brazilian singers
21st-century Brazilian women singers